Acestrorhynchus falcirostris is a species of fish in the family Acestrorhynchidae. It was described by Georges Cuvier in 1819, originally under the genus Hydrocyon. It inhabits the Orinoco and Amazon Rivers in the area of Guyana, at a pH range of 5.2-7.2, and a dH range of 5-18.

The diet of A. falcirostris includes finfish, shrimp and insects. It is harvested by commercial fisheries, and is also sold to public aquariums.

References

Acestrorhynchidae
Fish described in 1819
Taxa named by Georges Cuvier